This is a list of properties and districts in Lincoln County, Georgia that are listed on the National Register of Historic Places (NRHP).

Current listings

|}

References

Lincoln
Buildings and structures in Lincoln County, Georgia